The 2018 United States House of Representatives elections in Wisconsin were held on November 6, 2018, to elect the eight U.S. representatives from the state of Wisconsin, one from each of the state's eight congressional districts. The elections coincided with other elections to the House of Representatives, elections to the United States Senate, and various state and local elections. The Wisconsin Partisan Primary was held on August 14, 2018, with the governor, U.S. Senator, U.S. Representative, odd-numbered Wisconsin State Senate seats, and all Wisconsin Assembly seats on the ballot.
Wisconsin was notable in 2018 for being the only state in which the party receiving the majority of votes held a minority of congressional seats.

Results summary

Statewide

District
Results of the 2018 United States House of Representatives elections in Wisconsin by district:

District 1

The 1st congressional district is located in southeastern Wisconsin, covering Kenosha County, Racine County and most of Walworth County, as well as portions of Rock County, Waukesha County and Milwaukee County. The district's Representative was Republican, Paul Ryan, then Speaker of the House of Representatives and Republican candidate for Vice President of the United States in the 2012 U.S. presidential election. The district's Partisan Voter Index is R+5, indicating a slight Republican lean.

Ryan could potentially have seen a close race; in hypothetical polling, his main Democratic challenger, Randy Bryce, was behind Ryan by only seven points. Ryan was also facing challenges in the Republican primary from Paul Nehlen, who also challenged Ryan in 2016, and from Nick Polce. Ryan announced on April 11, 2018, that he is not seeking re-election. On April 22, Bryan Steil, member of the University of Wisconsin Board of Regents and former personal driver to Ryan, announced his bid for the seat, with news outlets reporting Steil as the Republican Party nominee front-runner.

Two Democrats announced; ironworker Randy Bryce and Janesville school board member Cathy Myers.

Democratic primary
Nominee
 Randy Bryce, Ironworker, union activist

Eliminated in primary
 Cathy Myers, Janesville School Board member (endorsed Randy Bryce)

Declined
 Peter Barca, member of the Wisconsin State Assembly and former U.S. Representative

Endorsements

Polling

Primary results

Republican primary
Nominee
Bryan Steil, University of Wisconsin Board of Regents member
Eliminated in primary
 Paul Nehlen, businessman and white nationalist
 Nick Polce, businessman and former Green Beret
Jeremy Ryan, activist
 Kevin Adam Steen, applications engineer

Withdrew
 Brad Boivin, psychologist (endorsed Steil)
 Jeff Wamboldt, county supervisor and police officer

Declined
 Tyler August, Speaker Pro-Tempore of the Wisconsin State Assembly
 Dave Craig, State Senator
 Samantha Kerkman, Member of the Wisconsin State Assembly
 Steve Nass, state senator
 Mark Neumann, former U.S. Representative and nominee for the U.S. Senate in 1998
 Reince Priebus, former White House Chief of Staff, former chairman of the Republican National Committee and former chairman of the Republican Party of Wisconsin
 Paul Ryan, incumbent representative and 54th Speaker of the House
 Robin Vos, Speaker of the Wisconsin State Assembly
 Van Wanggaard, state senator

Endorsements

Primary results

General election

Predictions

Endorsements

Polling

with Paul Ryan

Results

District 2

The 2nd congressional district covers Dane County, Iowa County, Lafayette County, Sauk County and Green County, as well as portions of Richland County and Rock County. The district includes Madison, the state's capital, its suburbs and some of the surrounding areas. The district is currently represented by Democrat Mark Pocan, who succeeded current Senator Tammy Baldwin in 2013. The PVI is D+18.

Democratic primary
Declared
 Mark Pocan, incumbent representative

Primary results

General election

Results

District 3

The 3rd congressional district covers much of the Driftless Area in southwestern and western Wisconsin; The district includes the cities of La Crosse and Eau Claire. It borders the states of Minnesota, Iowa, and Illinois. Democrat Ron Kind has represented the district since 1997. The PVI of the third district is EVEN, indicating an almost equal support of Democrats and Republicans. Kind is running for reelection. Steve Toft, a retired Army Colonel, is running for the Republican nomination.

Democratic primary
Declared
 Ron Kind, incumbent representative

Primary results

Republican primary
Declared
 Steve Toft, retired Army Colonel

Primary results

General election

Results

District 4

The 4th congressional district encompasses a part of Milwaukee County and including all of the city of Milwaukee and its working-class suburbs of Cudahy, St. Francis, South Milwaukee, and West Milwaukee. Recent redistricting has added the Milwaukee County North Shore communities of Glendale, Shorewood, Whitefish Bay, Fox Point, Bayside, and Brown Deer to the district. It is currently represented by Gwen Moore, a Democrat. The PVI of the district is D+25.

Democratic primary
Declared
 Gwen Moore, incumbent representative
 Gary George, former state senator

Primary results

Republican primary
Declared
 Cindy Werner, army veteran
 Tim Rogers, deliveryman

Primary results

Independent candidates
Declared
 Robert Raymond

General election

Results

District 5

The 5th congressional district covers all of Washington and Jefferson counties, some of Waukesha and Dodge counties, and portions of Milwaukee and Walworth counties. It is currently represented by Republican Jim Sensenbrenner, who has held the seat since 1978. The PVI is R+13. Sensenbrenner is running for reelection. Tom Palzewicz, a small business owner, is running for the Democratic nomination.

Democratic primary
Declared
 Tom Palzewicz, small businessman

Primary results

Republican primary
Declared
 Jim Sensenbrenner, incumbent representative
 Jennifer Hoppe Vipond, pediatrician

Primary results

General election

Results

District 6

The 6th congressional district is located in eastern Wisconsin, including the outer suburbs of Milwaukee, Madison, and Green Bay, it includes all or portions of the following counties: Adams, Columbia, Dodge, Fond du Lac, Green Lake, Jefferson, Manitowoc, Marquette, Ozaukee, Sheboygan, Waushara, and Winnebago.  It also includes a small portion of far northern Milwaukee County around River Hills. The district is represented by Glenn Grothman (R-Campbellsport) who came to office in January 2015. The PVI is R+8. Grothman ran for reelection. Dan Kohl, an attorney and former executive for the Milwaukee Bucks, won the Democratic nomination.

Democratic primary
Declared
 Dan Kohl, attorney, former Milwaukee Bucks executive

Primary results

Republican primary
Declared
 Glenn Grothman, incumbent representative

Primary results

General election

Polling

Results

District 7

The 7th congressional district is located in northern and western Wisconsin, and is the largest congressional district in the state geographically, covering 20 counties (in whole or part), for a total of 18,787 sq mi. The district contains the following counties: Ashland, Barron, Bayfield, Burnett, Chippewa, Clark (partial), Douglas, Iron, Langlade (partial), Lincoln, Marathon, Oneida, Polk, Portage, Price, Rusk, St. Croix, Sawyer, Taylor, Washburn and Wood. The district is currently represented by Sean Duffy, a Republican. The PVI of the district is R+8. Duffy is running for reelection.

Democratic primary
Declared
  Brian Ewert, Doctor
  Margaret Ruth Engebretson, Polk County Attorney

Primary results

Republican primary
Declared
 Sean Duffy, incumbent representative

Primary results

General election

Results

District 8

The 8th congressional district includes Green Bay and Appleton. It is currently represented by Mike Gallagher, a Republican. Gallagher won the open seat vacated by Reid Ribble. It is also one of two Congressional Districts to ever elect a Catholic Priest, Robert John Cornell. The PVI is R+7, and Gallagher won election to his first term with 62.65% of the vote. Gallagher is running for reelection. Beau Liegeois, a Brown County assistant district attorney, is running for the Democratic nomination.

Democratic primary
Declared
 Beau Liegeois, Brown County assistant district attorney

Primary results

Republican
Declared
 Mike Gallagher, incumbent representative

Primary results

General election

Results

References

External links
Wisconsin Elections Commission
Candidates on ballot for primary
Candidates at Vote Smart
Candidates at Ballotpedia
Campaign finance at FEC
Campaign finance at OpenSecrets

Official campaign websites of first district candidates
Randy Bryce (D) for Congress
Bryan Steil (R) for Congress
Ken Yorgan (I) for Congress

Official campaign websites of second district candidates
Mark Pocan (D) for Congress

Official campaign websites of third district candidates
Ron Kind (D) for Congress
Steve Toft (R) for Congress

Official campaign websites of fourth district candidates
Gwen Moore (D) for Congress
Robert Raymond (I) for Congress

Official campaign websites of fifth district candidates
Jim Sensenbrenner (R) for Congress
Tom Palzewicz (D) for Congress

Official campaign websites of sixth district candidates
Glenn Grothman (R) for Congress
Dan Kohl (D) for Congress

Official campaign websites of seventh district candidates
Sean Duffy (R) for Congress
Margaret Ruth Engebretson (D) for Congress

Official campaign websites of eighth district candidates
Mike Gallagher (R) for Wisconsin
Beau Liegeois (D) for Wisconsin

2018
Wisconsin
United States House of Representatives